Frederick Audley Mitchell Jr. (born 5 October 1953) is a Bahamian Progressive Liberal Party politician serving as Minister of Foreign Affairs for the third time. He is the Member of Parliament (MP) for Fox Hill, first elected in 2002 and then again in 2021. He also served two terms in the Senate.

Early life and education 
Mitchell was born in Nassau, the eldest son of Lilla (née Forde) and Frederick A. Mitchell Sr. His maternal grandfather was Barbadian. He attended Eastern Junior School, Sands School, and St. Augustine's College. He received his communications degree at Antioch University, his master's at Harvard University, and his law degree at the University of Buckingham.

Career
Mitchell was called to both the Bar of England and Wales and the Bar of the Bahamas. He worked in broadcasting and journalism.

Mitchell began his political career as a senator appointed by Free National Movement Prime Minister Hubert Ingraham in 1992. In the Senate, he was chairman of the Select Committee on Culture. He joined the Progressive Liberal Party and ran for the Fox Hill constituency in the 1997 general election. He tried again in 2002 and was elected to the Assembly.

He worked as editor of The Herald, a paper of the PLP and had a column in The Bahamas Uncensored. Mitchell served as Minister of Foreign Affairs in both Perry Christie governments. He chaired the CARICOM Council for Foreign and Community Relations and supported Haiti becoming a member state. He was a founding member of the Bahamas Committee on Southern Africa.

Mitchell lost his seat in the 2017 general election. Whilst out of the Assembly, he returned to the Senate as an opposition leader and PLP chairman. He regained Fox Hill in 2021 and was sworn back into his Foreign Minister post under Philip Davis.

Views and public image
During his time in politics, some of his peers have accused him of "catching feelings" and being "overly emotional". Mitchell has also come under criticism from socially conservative Bahamians for his support of LGBT+ rights. However he believes that he will be remembered like Nelson Mandela for his stance. Although his party had no official policy regarding the monarchy until 2022, he was personally against it prior to that.

See also
List of foreign ministers in 2017
List of current foreign ministers

References 

Living people
1953 births
20th-century Bahamian lawyers
Alumni of the University of Buckingham
Antioch College alumni
Bahamian Anglicans
Bahamian people of Barbadian descent
Bahamian republicans
Foreign ministers of the Bahamas
Government ministers of the Bahamas
Harvard University alumni
Members of the House of Assembly of the Bahamas
Members of the Senate of the Bahamas
Progressive Liberal Party politicians